Podex (also known as Puddocks and Puddex) is a variety of cricket played in some public schools in the UK and on youth camps, most famously Crusader Camp and Houseparty at Bethany School.  Unlike cricket it uses two instead of three stumps, and a bat rather like a rounders bat but more the length of cricket bat. A soft rather than a hard ball – a sorbo – is used. Kneale (2016) notes a variety in the rules of the game and suggests its origins lie in games played at camps organised by the Scripture Union prior to the First War.

The Henry Howard, 18th Earl of Suffolk's (1897) Encyclopedia of Sport includes this entry: In the summer a modification of cricket called puddex is played at odd times. A hard tennis ball and a thick round stick are used....The pitch must be fourteen yards long, the wicket at least a foot wide. No hit behind the wicket counts. Every batsman retires when he has made twenty-five ; only slow underhand is allowed. And Howard credits a Mr Andrew Lang with inventing the name.

Listings of rules
The rules, whilst highly debated, are as follows.

There are two batsman at all times, apart from the last man standing (see later). One scores a run by running from one end to the other. When one has reached 20 runs one has to run two runs every time they hit it.

One can get out in three ways. Bowled out, caught out or run out. One is bowled out if they are batting and the ball hits the stumps, and it bounces after the batsman. One is caught out if they hit the ball and a fielder catches it. One can be run out in a number of ways. On the first run whoever hit the ball is out and then can be stumped out at either end of they are not in. After the first run the person out is whoever's end it is stumped at. 

If the ball bounces before it reaches the batsman it is referred to as a grub and one cannot be out bowled but they can be out caught or run out if they hit the ball.

References

Forms of cricket
Ball and bat games